Karel Halík (born 21 December 1883, date of death unknown) was a Czech wrestler. He competed for Bohemia at the 1906, 1908 and 1912 Summer Olympics and for Czechoslovakia at the 1920 Summer Olympics.

References

External links
 

1883 births
Year of death missing
Olympic wrestlers of Bohemia
Olympic wrestlers of Czechoslovakia
Wrestlers at the 1906 Intercalated Games
Wrestlers at the 1908 Summer Olympics
Wrestlers at the 1912 Summer Olympics
Wrestlers at the 1920 Summer Olympics
Czech male sport wrestlers
Sportspeople from Prague
Sportspeople from the Austro-Hungarian Empire